Peter Wayne may refer to:

Stage name of Karl Swenson
Peter Wayne, character in 555 (1988 film)